American actor and filmmaker Tim Robbins started his acting career in 1982 with a few episodes on the medical drama series St. Elsewhere. His film debut was in the 1984 action film Toy Soldiers. He had minor roles in Fraternity Vacation (1985) and Top Gun (1986) before co-starring in the 1988 romantic comedy sports film Bull Durham with Kevin Costner. He went on to star in the films Erik the Viking with Mickey Rooney (1989), Jacob's Ladder with Elizabeth Peña (1990), Cadillac Man with Robin Williams (also 1990), and The Player with Greta Scacchi (1992). In 1994, he portrayed Andy Dufresne in The Shawshank Redemption with Morgan Freeman. To prepare for his role, he spent time in solitary confinement. He also appeared in the 2000 comedy film High Fidelity with John Cusack. In 2003, he co-starred in Clint Eastwood's neo-noir crime drama film Mystic River with Sean Penn. For that role, he won the Academy Award for Best Supporting Actor and Golden Globe Award for Best Supporting Actor – Motion Picture.

His television work includes the comedy series The Brink (2015), drama series Here and Now (2018), and psychological horror series Castle Rock (2019). As a director, Robbins has directed the films Bob Roberts (1992), Dead Man Walking (1995) and Cradle Will Rock (1999). For Dead Man Walking, he earned an Academy Award nomination for Best Director.

Film

Television

References

American filmographies
Director filmographies
Male actor filmographies